Wilkesboro may refer to several places in the United States:
 North Wilkesboro, North Carolina
 Wilkesboro, North Carolina
 Wilkesboro, Oregon